Rehman Medical College(RMC), a part of Rehman Medical Institute, is a Medical College in Khyber Pakhtunkhwa, Pakistan.

The college is associated with Khyber Medical University and is approved by PMDC for MBBS program.

References 
http://www.rmi.edu.pk/en

Medical colleges in Khyber Pakhtunkhwa
Khyber Medical University
2002 establishments in Pakistan
Public universities and colleges in Khyber Pakhtunkhwa
Universities and colleges in Peshawar
Hayatabad